India competed at the 2016 Summer Paralympics in Rio de Janeiro, Brazil, from 7 to 18 September 2016.
Indian athletes have appeared in every edition of the Summer Paralympic Games since 1968 (except 1976 & 1980 edition).

On August 8, 2016 Paralympic Committee of India announced a list of 19 competitors  (16 Men & 3 Women) to be part of Rio 2016 paralympic games for India in 5 sports.

India has sent its largest ever delegation in the history of summer paralympic games i.e.19 competitors in 5 sports. it has been India's best ever performance in the history of the summer Paralympic games with a total of 4 medals won ( 2 Gold, 1 Silver and 1 Bronze ) with Devendra Jhajharia breaking the World Record to win a gold medal at the Paralympics.Till this, India have won 4 Gold, 4 Silver and 4 Bronze from 1968 to 2016 over 48 years of India's Paralympic history.  Mariyappan Thangavelu is the first gold medallist for India in 2016 Paralympics.

Disability classifications

Every participant at the Paralympics has their disability grouped into one of five disability categories; amputation, the condition may be congenital or sustained through injury or illness; cerebral palsy; wheelchair athletes, there is often overlap between this and other categories; visual impairment, including blindness; Les autres, any physical disability that does not fall strictly under one of the other categories, for example dwarfism or multiple sclerosis.

Each Paralympic sport then has its own classifications, dependent upon the specific physical demands of competition. Events are given a code, made of numbers and letters, describing the type of event and classification of the athletes competing. Some sports, such as athletics, divide athletes by both the category and severity of their disabilities, other sports, for example swimming, group competitors from different categories together, the only separation being based on the severity of the disability.

Competitors

Medallists

Overall

Medals by Sports

Archery 
India has qualified one berth in Women individual recurve Archery event after Pooja Khanna secured fifth-place finish in final Paralympic qualifier to secure a continental quota in World Quota Recurve Women Open in Czech Republic 2016 & thus became first Para Archer from India to qualify for Paralympic Games.

Women 

|-
|Pooja Khanna
|Recurve Individual Open
|513
|29
| L 2–6
| colspan="4" |Did Not Advance
|29
|}

Athletics
Indian athletes have been able to achieve qualifying standard in the following athletic events (up to maximum of 3 athletes in each event) & after selection trials Paralympic Committee of India has selected a team of 15 athletes (13 Men & 2 Women) for the paralympic games.

Men 
Track  Events

Field Events

Women 
Field Events

Powerlifting

India has secured one berth in Men's event after National champion Farman Basha secured a place in World Ranking list as of February 29, 2016 in the given qualification period for the games.

Men

Shooting 

Naresh Kumar Sharma earned a qualifying berth for India in the R7 - Men's 50m Rifle 3 Positions event in last paralympic qualifier event in 2015 IPC Shooting World Cup in Fort Benning for the paralympic games.

Men

Swimming 
Indian swimmer Suyash Jadhav achieved A qualifying mark in the finals of Men's 50m Butterfly-S7 event at the International Wheelchair and Amputee Sports World Games 2015 for the Rio paralympic games.

Men

See also
India at the 2016 Summer Olympics

References

Nations at the 2016 Summer Paralympics
2016
2016 in Indian sport